José Blanco may refer to:
 José Blanco López (born 1962), Spanish politician
 Richard José Blanco (born 1982), Venezuelan footballer
 Juan José Blanco (born 1985), Uruguayan footballer
 José Blanco (cigar industrialist) (born 1949), Dominican-Nicaraguan cigar industrialist
 José Luis Blanco (born 1975), Spanish athlete
 José Iborra Blanco (born 1908), Spanish footballer